Shafiq bin Shaharudin (born 26 March 1994) is a Malaysian professional footballer who plays as a forward for Malaysia Super League club Kelantan.

Born in Batu Pahat, Johor, Shafiq started his career playing for Johor youth team.

Club career

Johor Darul Ta'zim II
Shafiq began his career with Johor youth team before been promoted to Johor Darul Ta'zim II in 2014.

Kelantan
In December 2017, Shafiq signed a two-year contract with Kelantan.

International career
On 5 July 2018, Shafiq made his debut for Malaysia national team in a 1–0 win over Fiji.

Career statistics

Club

International

Personal life
Shaharuddin Abdullah, his father also former Malaysia national player.

References

External links

Shafiq Shaharudin @ Worldfootball.com

1994 births
Living people
Malaysian footballers
Malaysia international footballers
People from Johor
People from Batu Pahat
Malaysian people of Malay descent
Johor Darul Ta'zim F.C. players
Kelantan F.C. players
Malaysia Super League players
Association football forwards